George Pratt may refer to:

Arts and sciences
George Pratt (artist) (born 1960), American painter and graphic novelist
George Pratt (missionary) (1817–1894), author of the first Samoan language grammar and dictionary
George Dupont Pratt (1869–1935), environmentalist

Politics and law
George Pratt, 2nd Marquess Camden (1799–1866), British peer and Tory politician
George W. Pratt (1830–1862), New York state senator, and Union Army colonel
 George Pratt (Connecticut politician) (1832–1875), American lawyer and politician
George White Pratt (1840–1899), Wisconsin state senator and assemblyman
George C. Pratt (born 1928), U.S. federal appellate judge

Characters
 George Pratt, a character in Philip Van Doren Stern's short story The Greatest Gift